Cicely Carew is an American artist. She was born in Los Angeles. She graduated from Massachusetts College of Art and Design in 2005, and Lesley University in 2020.

Exhibitions 

 “Call & Response,” Newport Art Museum, 2020
 Trustman Art Gallery, Simmons University, Boston, 2020
 “Ambrosia,” Now + There, The Prudential Center, 2021

References

External links 
https://www.cicelycarew.com/

21st-century American women artists
Massachusetts College of Art and Design alumni
Lesley University alumni
Living people
Year of birth missing (living people)